Peter Kretschmer (born 15 February 1992) is a German sprint canoer. He won the Gold Medal in the 2012 Summer Olympics in C-2 1000 metres category event for his country with Kurt Kuschela. In June 2015, he competed in the inaugural European Games, for Germany in canoe sprint, more specifically, Men's C-2 1000m with Michael Mueller. He earned a bronze medal.

References

External links
Profile

1992 births
German male canoeists
Living people
Canoeists at the 2012 Summer Olympics
Olympic canoeists of Germany
Olympic gold medalists for Germany
Olympic medalists in canoeing
ICF Canoe Sprint World Championships medalists in Canadian
Medalists at the 2012 Summer Olympics
European Games medalists in canoeing
Canoeists at the 2015 European Games
European Games bronze medalists for Germany
Sportspeople from Schwerin
Canoeists at the 2019 European Games